Handoff may refer to:
Handoff (aviation), a technique used in air traffic control
Handoff (American football), a type of offensive play in American football
Stiff-arm fend, a tactic used in rugby football
Handoff (Continuity), a feature introduced in Apple Inc's iOS 8 and OS X Yosemite operating systems

See also
Handover (disambiguation)